Waldberg  may refer to:

Places
 Waldberg (Bobingen), a constituent community of Bobingen, Augsburg, Bavaria, Germany
 Waldberg (Windigsteig), a village in Windigsteig, Lower Austria
 Waldberg (Ebbegebirge), a hill in the Ebbe Mountains, North Rhine-Westphalia, Germany
 Waldberg (Demmin), a village in Demmin, Mecklenburg-Vorpommern, Germany
 Waldberg (Sandberg), a village in Sandberg, Rhön-Grabfeld, Bavaria, Germany
 DJK Waldberg, a football club in the village of Waldberg, near Sandberg, Bavaria, Germany
 German name of Borowo (1906–1920 and 1939–1945), village east of Szamocin in Poland

 Waldberg, the German name for Monte Baldo, a mountain ridge in South Tyrol

People
 Max von Waldberg (1858–1938), German professor of modern literature
 Patrick Waldberg (1913–1985), Franco-American art critic

See also
 Waldburg (disambiguation)
 Wildberg (disambiguation)
 Wildburg (disambiguation)
 Wildenburg (disambiguation)
 Vorderwaldberg
 Hinterwaldberg